In chemistry, the amount of substance n in a given sample of matter is defined as the quantity or number of discrete atomic-scale particles in it divided by the Avogadro constant NA. The particles or entities may be molecules, atoms, ions, electrons, or other, depending on the context, and should be specified (e.g. amount of sodium chloride nNaCl). The mole (symbol: mol) is a unit of amount of substance in the International System of Units, defined (since 2019) by fixing the Avogadro constant at the given value. Sometimes, the amount of substance is referred to as the chemical amount.

Role of amount of substance and its unit mole in chemistry 
Historically, the mole was defined as the amount of substance in 12 grams of the carbon-12 isotope. As a consequence, the mass of one mole of a chemical compound, in grams, is numerically equal (for all practical purposes) to the mass of one molecule of the compound, in daltons, and the molar mass of an isotope in grams per mole is equal to the mass number. For example, a molecule of water has a mass of about 18.015  daltons on average, whereas a mole of water (which contains  water molecules) has a total mass of about 18.015 grams.

In chemistry, because of the law of multiple proportions, it is often much more convenient to work with amounts of substances (that is, number of moles or of molecules) than with masses (grams) or volumes (liters). The same chemical fact, expressed in terms of masses, would be "32 g  (1 mole) of oxygen  will react with approximately 4.0304 g (2 moles of ) hydrogen to make approximately 36.0304 g (2 moles) of water" (and the numbers would depend on the isotopic composition of the reagents). In terms of volume, the numbers would depend on the pressure and temperature of the reagents and products. For the same reasons, the concentrations of reagents and products in solution are often specified in moles per liter, rather than grams per liter.

The amount of substance is also a convenient concept in thermodynamics.  For example, the pressure of a certain quantity of a noble gas in a recipient of a given volume, at a given temperature, is directly related to the number of molecules in the gas (through the ideal gas law), not to its mass.

This technical sense of the term "amount of substance" should not be confused with the general sense of "amount" in the English language. The latter may refer to other measurements such as mass or volume, rather than the number of particles. There are proposals to replace "amount of substance" with more easily-distinguishable terms, such as enplethy  and stoichiometric amount.

The IUPAC recommends that "amount of substance" should be used instead of "number of moles", just as the quantity mass should not be called "number of kilograms".

Nature of the particles

To avoid ambiguity, the nature of the particles should be specified in any measurement of the amount of substance: thus, a sample of 1 mol of molecules of oxygen has a mass of about 32 grams, whereas a sample of 1 mol of atoms of oxygen has a mass of about 16 grams.

Derived quantities

Molar quantities (per mole)
The quotient of some extensive physical quantity of a homogeneous sample by its amount of substance is an intensive property of the substance, usually named by the prefix molar.

For example, the ratio of the mass of a sample by its amount of substance is the molar mass, whose SI unit is kilograms (or, more usually, grams) per mole; which is about 18.015 g/mol for water, and 55.845 g/mol for iron.  From the volume, one gets the molar volume, which is about 17.962 milliliter/mol for liquid water and 7.092 mL/mol for iron at room temperature.  From the heat capacity, one gets the molar heat capacity, which is about 75.385 J/K/mol for water and about 25.10 J/K/mol for iron.

Amount concentration (moles per liter)
Another important derived quantity is the amount of substance concentration (also called amount concentration, or substance concentration in clinical chemistry; which is defined as the amount of a specific substance in a sample of a solution (or some other mixture), divided by the volume of the sample.

The SI unit of this quantity is the mole (of the substance) per liter (of the solution).  Thus, for example, the amount concentration of sodium chloride in ocean water is typically about 0.599 mol/L.

The denominator is the volume of the solution, not of the solvent. Thus, for example, one liter of standard vodka contains about 0.40 L of ethanol (315 g, 6.85 mol) and 0.60 L of water. The amount concentration of ethanol is therefore (6.85 mol of ethanol)/(1 L of vodka) = 6.85 mol/L, not (6.85 mol of ethanol)/(0.60 L of water), which would be 11.4 mol/L.

In chemistry, it is customary to read the unit "mol/L" as molar, and denote it by the symbol "M" (both following the numeric value). Thus, for example, each liter of a "0.5 molar" or "0.5 M" solution of urea in water contains 0.5 moles of that molecule.  By extension, the amount concentration is also commonly called the molarity of the substance of interest in the solution.  However, as of May 2007, these terms and symbols are not condoned by IUPAC.

This quantity should not be confused with the mass concentration, which is the mass of the substance of interest divided by the volume of the solution (about 35 g/L for sodium chloride in ocean water).

Amount fraction (moles per mole)
Confusingly, the amount concentration, or "molarity", should also be distinguished from "molar concentration", which should be the number of moles (molecules) of the substance of interest divided by the total number of moles (molecules) in the solution sample.  This quantity is more properly called the amount fraction.

History
The alchemists, and especially the early metallurgists, probably had some notion of amount of substance, but there are no surviving records of any generalization of the idea beyond a set of recipes. In 1758, Mikhail Lomonosov questioned the idea that mass was the only measure of the quantity of matter, but he did so only in relation to his theories on gravitation. The development of the concept of amount of substance was coincidental with, and vital to, the birth of modern chemistry.
 1777: Wenzel publishes Lessons on Affinity, in which he demonstrates that the proportions of the "base component" and the "acid component" (cation and anion in modern terminology) remain the same during reactions between two neutral salts.
 1789: Lavoisier publishes Treatise of Elementary Chemistry, introducing the concept of a chemical element and clarifying the Law of conservation of mass for chemical reactions.
 1792: Richter publishes the first volume of Stoichiometry or the Art of Measuring the Chemical Elements (publication of subsequent volumes continues until 1802). The term "stoichiometry" is used for the first time. The first tables of equivalent weights are published for acid–base reactions. Richter also notes that, for a given acid, the equivalent mass of the acid is proportional to the mass of oxygen in the base.
 1794: Proust's Law of definite proportions generalizes the concept of equivalent weights to all types of chemical reaction, not simply acid–base reactions.
 1805: Dalton publishes his first paper on modern atomic theory, including a "Table of the relative weights of the ultimate particles of gaseous and other bodies".
The concept of atoms raised the question of their weight. While many were skeptical about the reality of atoms, chemists quickly found atomic weights to be an invaluable tool in expressing stoichiometric relationships.
 1808: Publication of Dalton's A New System of Chemical Philosophy, containing the first table of atomic weights (based on H = 1).
 1809: Gay-Lussac's Law of combining volumes, stating an integer relationship between the volumes of reactants and products in the chemical reactions of gases.
 1811: Avogadro hypothesizes that equal volumes of different gases (at same temperature and pressure) contain equal numbers of particles, now known as Avogadro's law.
 1813/1814: Berzelius publishes the first of several tables of atomic weights based on the scale of O = 100.
 1815: Prout publishes his hypothesis that all atomic weights are integer multiple of the atomic weight of hydrogen. The hypothesis is later abandoned given the observed atomic weight of chlorine (approx. 35.5 relative to hydrogen).
 1819: Dulong–Petit law relating the atomic weight of a solid element to its specific heat capacity.
 1819: Mitscherlich's work on crystal isomorphism allows many chemical formulae to be clarified, resolving several ambiguities in the calculation of atomic weights.
 1834: Clapeyron states the ideal gas law.
The ideal gas law was the first to be discovered of many relationships between the number of atoms or molecules in a system and other physical properties of the system, apart from its mass. However, this was not sufficient to convince all scientists of the existence of atoms and molecules, many considered it simply being a useful tool for calculation.
 1834: Faraday states his Laws of electrolysis, in particular that "the chemical decomposing action of a current is constant for a constant quantity of electricity".
 1856: Krönig derives the ideal gas law from kinetic theory. Clausius publishes an independent derivation the following year.
 1860: The Karlsruhe Congress debates the relation between "physical molecules", "chemical molecules" and atoms, without reaching consensus.
 1865: Loschmidt makes the first estimate of the size of gas molecules and hence of number of molecules in a given volume of gas, now known as the Loschmidt constant.
 1886: van't Hoff demonstrates the similarities in behaviour between dilute solutions and ideal gases.
 1886: Eugen Goldstein observes discrete particle rays in gas discharges, laying the foundation of mass spectrometry, a tool subsequently used to establish the masses of atoms and molecules.
 1887: Arrhenius describes the dissociation of electrolyte in solution, resolving one of the problems in the study of colligative properties.
 1893: First recorded use of the term mole to describe a unit of amount of substance by Ostwald in a university textbook.
 1897: First recorded use of the term mole in English.
 By the turn of the twentieth century, the concept of atomic and molecular entities was generally accepted, but many questions remained, not least the size of atoms and their number in a given sample. The concurrent development of mass spectrometry, starting in 1886, supported the concept of atomic and molecular mass and provided a tool of direct relative measurement.
 1905: Einstein's paper on Brownian motion dispels any last doubts on the physical reality of atoms, and opens the way for an accurate determination of their mass.
 1909: Perrin coins the name Avogadro constant and estimates its value.
 1913: Discovery of isotopes of non-radioactive elements by Soddy and Thomson.
 1914: Richards receives the Nobel Prize in Chemistry for "his determinations of the atomic weight of a large number of elements".
 1920: Aston proposes the whole number rule, an updated version of Prout's hypothesis.
 1921: Soddy receives the Nobel Prize in Chemistry "for his work on the chemistry of radioactive substances and investigations into isotopes".
 1922: Aston receives the Nobel Prize in Chemistry "for his discovery of isotopes in a large number of non-radioactive elements, and for his whole-number rule".
 1926: Perrin receives the Nobel Prize in Physics, in part for his work in measuring the Avogadro constant.
 1959/1960: Unified atomic mass unit scale based on C = 12 adopted by IUPAP and IUPAC.
 1968: The mole is recommended for inclusion in the International System of Units (SI) by the International Committee for Weights and Measures (CIPM).
 1972: The mole is approved as the SI base unit of amount of substance.
 2019: The mole is redefined in the SI as "the amount of substance of a system that contains  specified elementary entities".

See also
 Amount fraction
 International System of Quantities

References

 
SI base quantities